Champ Pegasus (foaled April 6th, 2006) is an American Thoroughbred racehorse and the winner of the 2010 Clement L. Hirsch Turf Championship Stakes.

Career

Champ Pegasus' first race was on December 9, 2009, at Hollywood Park, where he came in 5th. He gained his first win on April 14, 2010, at Santa Anita, and then won again at Hollywood Park on June 12, 2010.

He won his first graded race on August 29, 2010, by winning the 2010 Del Mar Handicap. He then won his second graded race on October 3, 2010, as he won the Clement L. Hirsch Turf Championship Stakes.

He placed second in the 2010 Breeders' Cup Turf in November and then placed second against in the January 2011 San Marcos Stakes. 

He then grabbed the last win of his career on February 19, 2011, at the San Luis Obispo Handicap. 

In his final race on October 2, 2011, he came in second place at the Clement L. Hirsch Turf Championship Stakes.

Pedigree

References

2006 racehorse births